Operacija Trijumf (Cyrillic: Операција Тријумф; English: Operation Triumph) was a regional music talent TV reality show filmed in Belgrade, Serbia, aired in the region of former Yugoslavia. It is a local version of Star Academy reality series that was developed and is licensed worldwide by Endemol. The show features contestants from the former Yugoslav republics of Croatia, Serbia, Bosnia & Herzegovina, Macedonia and Montenegro, the show is broadcast by 6 networks in these five countries. The winner of Operacija Trijumf is Adnan Babajić.

Run by Emotion production company from Serbia (local Endemol licence holder), Operacija trijumfs sole season began on September 29, 2008. The production format consists of gala evenings held each Monday night in prime time and hosted by a 4-person crew (Ana Mihajlovski, Nikolina Pišek, Milan Kalinić, and Dragan "Maca" Marinković). Additionally, there's a weekly recap show "OT mozak" hosted by Sanja Rajković-Jovanović on Tuesdays as well as variety show "Najgori od sve dece" (The Worst of All the Children/Candidates) hosted by Marijana Mićić and Maca on Saturdays.

The jury was formed by Marina Tucaković, Tonči Huljić and Ismeta Dervoz.

Gala evenings

First gala
The very first gala evening on Monday September 29, 2008 featured the introduction to 16 contestants that have entered the Academy as well as performances from Anastacia, Karolina Gočeva, Sergej Ćetković, Jelena Rozga, Deen, Let 3, and Marija Šerifović.

Second gala
The second gala evening on October 6 featured performances from Željko Joksimović, Severina, and Laka. Contestants Nikola Paunović and Ivana Nikodijević were nominated. The favourite of the audience was Aleksandar Belov.

Third gala
The third gala evening on October 13 featured Magazin and Zana. It is the first gala evening that had a contestant expelled, Ivana Nikodijević being the first expelled candidate. Contestants Antonija Besednik and Đorđe Gogov were nominated. The favourite of the audience was Aleksandar Belov.

Fourth gala
The fourth gala evening on October 20 featured Elena Risteska, Željko Samardžić, Atomsko sklonište, Sky Wikluh and Ajs Nigrutin. Contestant Antonija Besednik was expelled. Sky Wikluh and Ajs Nigrutin stayed in the academy with the contestants for a week. Contestants Andrea Harapin and Nikola Sarić were nominated. The favourite of the audience was Aleksandar Belov.

Fifth gala
The fifth gala evening on October 27 featured Kemal Monteno and Boris Novković. Contestant Andrea Harapin was expelled. Contestants Danijel Pavlović and Jasmina Midžić were nominated.

On October 29, 2008 two new contestants entered the house: Mirjana Kostić and Kristijan Jovanov.

And, once again, the favourite of the audience was Aleksandar Belov.

Sixth gala
The sixth gala evening on November 3 featured Marina Perazić and Negative. Contestant Jasmina Midžić was expelled. The contestants were punished for breaking the rules, by having all the contestants nominated. Jurry, professors and the students themselves could save a grand total of four students, including Aleksandar Belov, who was that week's favorite. They eventually saved Ana Bebić, Sonja Bakić, Igor Cukrov and Đorđe Gogov. The choice of Sonja Bakić by the students was criticized by the audience, because she was highly responsible for the punishment. The other 9 contestants were nominated.

Seventh gala
The seventh gala evening on November 10 featured Kaliopi, Dado Topić, and Gru. Two students were expelled this time - Mirjana Kostić and Kristijan Jovanov. Contestants Adnan Babajić and Milica Majstorović were nominated. The favourite of the audience was Aleksandar Belov.

Eighth gala
The eight gala on November 17 featured Colonia and Divlje jagode. Contestant Milica Majstorović was expelled. Contestants Đorđe Gogov and Vukašin Brajić were nominated.
One more time, Aleksandar Belov was chosen by the audience to be its favourite.

Ninth gala
The ninth gala on November 24 featured Bojan Marović and Danijela Martinović. Contestant Đorđe Gogov was expelled. Contestants Nikola Paunović and Ana Bebić were nominated. The favourite, according to the audience, was Aleksandar Belov.

Tenth gala
The tenth gala on December 1 was supposed to feature Aleksandra Radović and Goran Karan. Unfortunately, Marina Tucaković's son died on the day of the Gala so it was moved to December 8.
The new gala featured Emina Jahović and Jelena Rozga. Contestant Nikola Paunović was expelled, while contestants Nikola Sarić and Vukašin Brajić were nominated.
The favourite of the audience was Aleksandar Belov.

Eleventh gala
The eleventh gala on December 15, featured Petar Grašo and Karolina Gočeva. Contestant Nikola Sarić was expelled, while contestants Sonja Bakić and Vukašin Brajić were nominated.Aleksandar Belov was the favourite of the audience once again.

Twelfth gala
The twelfth gala on December 22, featured Goran Karan, Aleksandra Radović and Junior Jack. Contestant Sonja Bakić was expelled, and contestants Vukašin Brajić and Igor Cukrov were nominated.

Thirteenth gala
The thirteenth gala on December 29, featured Sakis Rouvas, Jelena Tomašević and Milena Vučić. Student Igor Cukrov was expelled and the rest of the students entered the semi-finale.

Fourteenth gala/Semi-final
The fourteenth gala, the semi-finale on January 4, featured Aki Rahimovski and YU grupa. Student Ana Bebić was expelled and the rest of the students entered the finale.

Fifteenth gala/Final
The fifteenth gala was on January 5 and the winner was announced: Adnan Babajić. The fifth place was taken by Danijel Pavlović, fourth was Nina Petković, 2nd runner up was Aleksandar Belov, 1st runner up was Vukašin Brajić and the winner, Adnan Babajić'.

Candidates

Elimination chart

 The contestant won the show
 The contestant lost in the final
 The contestant was nominated
 The contestant was nominated, but saved by the academy
 The contestant was nominated, but saved by the jury
 The contestant was nominated, but saved by the students
 The contestant was on "Najgori od sve dece"
 The contestant was expelled
 The contestant was a favourite according to the audience
 The contestant made a guest appearance after being expelled

References

External links

2008 Serbian television series debuts
2009 Serbian television series endings
Serbian talent shows
Croatian reality television series
Serbian reality television series
Star Academy
Bosnia and Herzegovina television series
Montenegrin television series
B92 original programming